Peter Frumkin is a professor and published author whose research and teaching are focused in the areas of philanthropy, nonprofit management, and social entrepreneurship.

Professional life 
Frumkin currently is the Mindy and Andrew Heyer Chair in Social Policy at the University of Pennsylvania. There he directs the Masters in Nonprofit Leadership Program and serves as faculty director of the Center for Social Impact Strategy.

Frumkin was once a senior fellow at the New America Foundation and associate professor at Harvard University’s School of Government. He then became Professor of Public Affairs and served as the Director of the RGK Center for Philanthropy and Community Service located in the LBJ School of Public Affairs at the University of Texas at Austin.

He has served as a strategy and evaluation consultant to donors and foundations, and also has experience as a foundation program officer, public and nonprofit agency program evaluator, and a nonprofit manager.

Publications 

Frumkin has authored several books and articles on all aspects of philanthropy and topics related to nonprofit management, grant-making strategy, social entrepreneurship, national service programs, and service contracting.

Key Publications:

Building for the Arts: The Strategic Design of Cultural Facilities, University of Chicago Press, 2014, Co-author with Ana Kolendo
Serving Country and Community, Harvard University Press, 2010, Co-author with JoAnn Jastrzab
The Essence of Strategic Giving, University of Chicago Press, 2010
Strategic Giving: The Art and Science of Philanthropy, University of Chicago, 2006
On Being Nonprofit: A Conceptual and Policy Primer, Harvard University Press, 2002

Awards 

2007 John Grenzebach Award for Outstanding Research in Philanthropy for Educational Advancement, Outstanding Published Scholarship for Strategic Giving
2007 ARNOVA Outstanding Book in Nonprofit & Voluntary Action Research Honorable Mention for Strategic Giving
2005 Best Book Award, Sponsored by the Academy of Management, Public and Nonprofit Division for On Being Nonprofit
2004 Marshall E. Dimock Award from the American Society of Public Administration for Best Article in Public Administrative Review for "Reengineering Nonprofit Financial Accountability" with Elizabeth Keating

Education 

Ph.D. in Sociology, University of Chicago
M.P.P., Georgetown University
B.A., Oberlin College

References

External links
Bio from Penn's School of Social Policy & Practice
Peter Frumkin's bio from the RGK Center for Philanthropy and Community Service

Harvard Kennedy School faculty
University of Chicago alumni
McDonough School of Business alumni
Living people
University of Texas at Austin faculty
Year of birth missing (living people)